The Hafshuye Mosque is a historical mosque in the Isfahan province, Iran. It dates back to the seljukid era. The main part of the mosque, especially its dome, has been destroyed and its wall has been damaged. The structure has been built mainly with adobes, but its facade has been worked with bricks.

See also 
 List of the historical structures in the Isfahan province

References 

Mosques in Isfahan